Epigonus of Thessalonica (dates unknown) is an epigrammatist quoted in the Greek Anthology. Both the Palatine and Planudean codices attribute AP 9.261, an epigram on an ageing vine, to Epigonus; the Planudean codex attributes two more poems to him.

References

Ancient Macedonian poets
Ancient Thessalonians
Epigrammatists of the Greek Anthology